David Rivers (born July 23, 1994) is an American football cornerback who is currently a free agent. He played college football at Youngstown State.

Professional career

Green Bay Packers
Rivers signed with the Green Bay Packers as an undrafted free agent on May 5, 2017. He was waived by the Packers on June 7, 2017.

New York Jets
On July 30, 2017, Rivers was signed by the New York Jets. He was waived by the Jets on September 1, 2017.

Tampa Bay Buccaneers
On September 19, 2017, Rivers was signed to the Tampa Bay Buccaneers' practice squad. He was released on November 15, 2017, but was re-signed a week later. He was released again on November 28, 2017.

Miami Dolphins
On December 5, 2017, Rivers was signed to the Miami Dolphins' practice squad.

Tampa Bay Buccaneers (second stint)
On December 20, 2017, Rivers was signed by the Buccaneers off the Dolphins' practice squad.

On August 8, 2018, Rivers was waived/injured by the Buccaneers and placed on injured reserve. He was released on August 14, 2018. On October 16, 2018, Rivers was re-signed to the Buccaneers practice squad. He was promoted to the active roster on November 28, 2018.

On May 24, 2019, the Buccaneers waived Rivers.

Miami Dolphins (second stint)
On July 23, 2019, Rivers was signed by the Miami Dolphins. He was released during final roster cuts on August 31, 2019.

New York Guardians
Rivers was drafted in the 3rd round during phase four in the 2020 XFL Draft by the New York Guardians.

St. Louis BattleHawks
On January 17, 2020, Rivers was traded to the St. Louis BattleHawks, along with offensive tackle Brian Wallace, in exchange for offensive linemen Dejon Allen and Avery Young. He had his contract terminated when the league suspended operations on April 10, 2020.

Winnipeg Blue Bombers
Rivers signed with the Winnipeg Blue Bombers of the CFL on July 9, 2021.

New Jersey Generals
Rivers was selected in the 10th round of the 2022 USFL Draft by the New Jersey Generals.

References

External links
Youngstown State Penguins bio
Tampa Bay Buccaneers bio

1994 births
Living people
American football cornerbacks
Green Bay Packers players
Miami Dolphins players
New York Guardians players
New York Jets players
Players of American football from Miami
American Senior High School (Miami-Dade County, Florida) alumni
St. Louis BattleHawks players
Tampa Bay Buccaneers players
Winnipeg Blue Bombers players
Youngstown State Penguins football players
Players of Canadian football from Miami
New Jersey Generals (2022) players